Abi Al-Khaseeb Sport Club, is an Iraqi football team based in Abu Al-Khaseeb, Basra, that plays in Iraq Division Three.

History
Abi Al-Khaseeb Club was founded in 1990 in Basra.

See also 
 2000–01 Iraqi Elite League
 2020–21 Iraq FA Cup

References

External links
 Abi Al-Khaseeb SC on Goalzz.com
 Basra Clubs Union

Football clubs in Iraq
1990 establishments in Iraq
Association football clubs established in 1990
Football clubs in Basra
Basra